Grendel is a character in the Anglo-Saxon epic poem Beowulf (700–1000). He is one of the poem's three antagonists (along with his mother and the dragon), all aligned in opposition against the protagonist Beowulf. Grendel is feared by all in Heorot but Beowulf. A descendant of Cain, Grendel is described as "a creature of darkness, exiled from happiness and accursed of God, the destroyer and devourer of our human kind". He is usually depicted as a monster or a giant, although his status as a monster, giant, or other form of supernatural being is not clearly described in the poem and thus remains the subject of scholarly debate. The character of Grendel and his role in the story of Beowulf have been subject to numerous reinterpretations and re-imaginings.

Story

Grendel is a character in the poem Beowulf, preserved in the Nowell Codex. Grendel, being cursed as the descendant of the Biblical Cain, is "harrowed" by the sounds of singing that come every night from the mead-hall of Heorot built by King Hrothgar. He is unable to bear it any more and attacks Heorot. Grendel continues to attack the Hall every night for twelve years, killing its inhabitants and making this magnificent mead-hall unusable. To add to his monstrous description the poet details how Grendel consumes the men he kills; "now that he could hope to eat his fill."

Beowulf hears of these attacks and leaves his native land of the Geats to destroy Grendel. He is warmly welcomed by King Hrothgar, who gives a banquet in celebration. Afterwards Beowulf and his warriors bed down in the mead hall to await the inevitable attack of the creature. Grendel stalks outside the building for a time, spying the warriors inside. He then makes a sudden attack, bursting the door with his fists and continuing through the entry. The first warrior Grendel finds is still asleep, so he seizes the man and devours him. Grendel grabs a second warrior, but is shocked when the warrior grabs back with fearsome strength. As Grendel attempts to disengage, the reader discovers that Beowulf is that second warrior. Beowulf uses neither weapon nor armour in this fight. He also places no reliance on his companions and had no need of them. He trusts that God has given him strength to defeat Grendel, whom he believes is God's adversary. Finally Beowulf tears off Grendel's arm, mortally wounding the creature. Grendel flees but dies in his marsh den. There, Beowulf later engages in a fierce battle with Grendel's mother, over whom he triumphs even if only thanks to a sword found on-site. Following her death, Beowulf finds Grendel's corpse and removes his head, which he keeps as a trophy. Beowulf then returns to the surface and to his men at the "ninth hour" (l. 1600, "nōn", about 3 pm). He returns to Heorot, where a grateful Hrothgar showers him with gifts.

Scholarship

Tolkien
In 1936, J. R. R. Tolkien's Beowulf: The Monsters and the Critics discussed Grendel and the dragon in Beowulf. Tolkien argues that "the evil spirits took visible shape" in the characters of Grendel and the dragon; however, the author's concern is focused on Beowulf. Tolkien points out that while Grendel has Christian origins as the descendant of Cain, he "cannot be dissociated from the creatures of northern myth." Tolkien also argues for the importance of Grendel's role in the poem as an "eminently suitable beginning" that sets the stage for Beowulf's fight with the dragon: "Triumph over the lesser and more nearly human is cancelled by defeat before the older and more elemental." Tolkien's essay was the first work of scholarship in which Anglo-Saxon literature was seriously examined on its literary merits – not just for scholarship about the origins of the English language, or what historical information could be gleaned from the text, as was common in the 19th century. Tolkien also wrote his own translation of Beowulf, entitled Beowulf: A Translation and Commentary together with Sellic Spell, between 1920 and 1926.

Physical description
During the decades following Tolkien's essay, the exact description of Grendel was debated by scholars. Indeed, because his exact appearance is never directly described in Old English by the original Beowulf poet, part of the debate revolves around what is known, namely his descent from the biblical Cain (the first murderer in the Bible). Grendel is called a sceadugenga – "shadow walker", in other words "night goer" – given that the monster was repeatedly described to be in the shroud of darkness.

A visual interpretation is the depiction of Grendel in Robert Zemeckis's 2007 film Beowulf.

Interpretations
Some scholars have linked Grendel's descent from Cain to the monsters and giants of the Cain tradition.

Seamus Heaney, in his translation of Beowulf, writes in lines 1351–1355 that Grendel is vaguely human in shape, though much larger:

Heaney's translation of lines 1637–1639 also notes that Grendel's disembodied head is so large that it takes four men to transport it. Furthermore, in lines 983–989, when Grendel's torn arm is inspected, Heaney describes it as being covered in impenetrable scales and horny growths:

Alfred Bammesgerber looks closely at line 1266 where Grendel's ancestry is said to be the "misbegotten spirits" that sprang from Cain after he was cursed. He argues that the words in Old English, geosceaftgasta, should be translated "the great former creation of spirits".

Peter Dickinson (1979) argued that seeing as the considered distinction between man and beast at the time the poem was written was simply man's bipedalism, the given description of Grendel being man-like does not necessarily imply that Grendel is meant to be humanoid, going as far as stating that Grendel could easily have been a bipedal dragon.

Other scholars such as Sherman Kuhn (1979) have questioned Grendel's description as a monster, stating:

Katherine O'Keefe has suggested that Grendel resembles a berserker, because of numerous associations that seem to point to this possibility.

Sonya R. Jensen argues for an identification between Grendel and Agnar, son of Ingeld, and suggests that the tale of the first two monsters is actually the tale of Ingeld, as mentioned by Alcuin in the 790s. The tale of Agnar tells how he was cut in half by the warrior Bothvar Bjarki (Warlike little Bear), and how he died "with his lips separated into a smile". One major parallel between Agnar and Grendel would thus be that the monster of the poem has a name perhaps composed of a combination of the words gren and daelan. The poet may be stressing to his audience that Grendel "died laughing", or that he was gren-dael[ed] or "grin-divid[ed]", after having his arm torn off at the shoulder by Beowulf, whose name means bee-wolf or bear.

Depictions

Grendel appears in many other cultural works.

Citations

General and cited references 
 Cawson, Frank. The Monsters in the Mind: The Face of Evil in Myth, Literature, and Contemporary Life. Sussex, England: Book Guild, 1995: 38–39.
 Gardner, John. Grendel. New York, 1971.
 Heyne, Moritz. Harrison, James A. Sharp, Robert. Beowulf: An Anglo-Saxon Poem, and The Fight at Finnsburg: a Fragment Boston, Massachusetts: Ginn & Company, 1895.
 Jack, George. Beowulf: A Student Edition. Oxford University Press: New York, 1997.
 Jensen, S. R. Beowulf and the Monsters. ARRC: Sydney, corrected edition, 1998. Extracts available online.
 Jensen, S. R. Beowulf and the Battle – beasts of Yore. ARRC: Sydney, 2004. Available online.
 Klaeber, Frederick, ed. Beowulf and the Fight at Finnsburg. Third ed. Boston: Heath, 1950.
 Kuhn, Sherman M. "Old English Aglaeca – Middle Irish Olach". Linguistic Method: Essays in Honor of Herbert Penzl. Eds. Irmengard Rauch and Gerald F. Carr. The Hague, New York: Mouton Publishers, 1979. 213–30.
 Thorpe, Benjamin (trans.). The Anglo-Saxon Poems of Beowulf: The Scôp or Gleeman's Tale and the Fight at Finnesburg Oxford University Press. 1885.
 Tolkien, J. R. R. (1937). Beowulf, the Monsters and the Critics. First ed. Sir Israel Gollancz Memorial Lecture, British Academy, 1936. London: Humphrey Milford.

External links 
 

Characters in Beowulf
Fictional monsters
Male literary villains
Mythological anthropophages
Therianthropy